Bethany Hayward (born 20 November 1996) is a British professional racing cyclist who rides for Team Ford EcoBoost as of 2016/17.

See also
 List of 2016 UCI Women's Teams and riders

References

External links
 

1996 births
Living people
British female cyclists
Place of birth missing (living people)
21st-century British women